On 23 October, 1989 at approximately 1:05 PM Central Daylight Time, a series of explosions occurred at Phillips Petroleum Company's Houston Chemical Complex in Pasadena, Texas, near the Houston Ship Channel. The initial blast registered 3.5 on the Richter scale, and the resulting fires took 10 hours to bring under control, as efforts to battle the fire were hindered due to damaged water pipes for the fire hydrants from the blast. The initial explosion was found to have resulted from a release of extremely flammable process gasses used to produce high-density polyethylene, a plastic used for various consumer food container products. The US Occupational Safety and Health Administration fined Phillips Petroleum Company $5,666,200 and fined Fish Engineering and Construction, inc, the maintenance contractor, $729,600. The event killed 23 employees and injured 314.

Prior to the disaster

Approximately 1500 people worked at the facility, including 905 company employees and approximately 600 daily contract employees, who were engaged primarily in regular maintenance activities and new plant construction.

Cause
The accident resulted from a release of extremely flammable process gases that occurred during regular maintenance operations on one of the plant's polyethylene reactors.

During routine maintenance, isolation valves were closed and compressed air hoses that actuated them physically disconnected as a safety measure. The air connections for opening and closing this valve were identical, and had been improperly reversed when last re-connected. As a result, the valve would have been open while the switch in the control room was in the "valve closed" position. After that, the valve was opened when it was expected to stay closed, and finally passed the reactor content into air.
A vapor cloud formed and travelled rapidly through the polyethylene plant. Within 90 to 120 seconds, the vapor cloud came into contact with an ignition source and exploded with the force of 2.4 tons of TNT. Ten to fifteen minutes later, that was followed by the explosion of the  isobutane storage tank, then by the catastrophic failure of another polyethylene reactor, and finally by other explosions, probably about six in total.

Explosions

The incident started at approximately 1:05 PM local time on October 23, 1989, at 1400 Jefferson Road, Pasadena, Texas. A powerful and devastating explosion and fire ripped through the HCC, killing 23 people—all working at the facility—and injuring 314 others (185 Phillips Petroleum Company employees and 129 contract employees). In addition to the loss of life and injuries, the explosion affected all facilities within the complex, causing $715.5 million worth of damage plus an additional business disruption loss estimated at $700 million. The two polyethylene production plants nearest the source of the blast were destroyed, and in the HCC administration building nearly 0.5 mile away, windows were shattered and bricks ripped out. The initial explosion was equivalent to an earthquake registering 3.5 on the Richter scale and threw debris as far away as six miles.

Early response

The initial response was provided by the Phillips Petroleum Company fire brigade which was soon joined by members of the Channel Industries Mutual Aid association (CIMA). Cooperating governmental agencies were the Texas Air Control Board, the Harris County Pollution Control Board, the Federal Aviation Administration (FAA), the U.S. Coast Guard, the Occupational Safety and Health Administration (OSHA) and the U.S. Environmental Protection Agency (EPA).

Firefighting
The firefighting water system at the HCC was part of the process water system. When the first explosion occurred, some fire hydrants were sheared off at ground level by the blast. The result was inadequate water pressure for firefighting. The shut-off valves which could have been used to prevent the loss of water from ruptured lines in the plant were out of reach in the burning wreckage. No remotely operated fail-safe isolation valves existed in the combined plant/firefighting water system. In addition, the regular-service fire-water pumps were disabled by the fire which destroyed their electrical power cables. Of the three backup diesel-operated fire pumps, one had been taken out of service, and one ran out of fuel in about an hour. Firefighting water was brought in by hoses laid to remote sources: settling ponds, a cooling tower, a water main at a neighboring plant, and even the Houston Ship Channel. The fire was brought under control within about 10 hours as a result of the combined efforts of fire brigades from other nearby companies, local fire departments, and the Phillips Petroleum Company foam trucks and fire brigade.

Search and rescue

Search and rescue efforts were delayed until the fire and heat subsided and all danger of further explosions had passed. These operations were difficult because of the extensive devastation in the HCC and the danger of structural collapse. The Phillips Petroleum Company requested, and the FAA approved and implemented, a one-mile no-fly zone around the plant to prevent engine vibration and/or helicopter rotor downwash from dislodging any of the wreckage. The U.S. Coast Guard and Port of Houston fire boats evacuated to safety over 100 trapped people across the Houston Ship Channel. OSHA preserved evidence for evaluation regarding the cause of the catastrophe.

List of casualties

Phillips Petroleum Company employees
Fatally wounded, listed by name, age, city of residence within Texas, and official date of death (following recovery and identification of remains or eventual death from injuries) 
Stephen Donald Huff, 21, 25 October 1989
Ruben Quilantan Alamillo, 35, Houston, 25 October 1989
James Edward Allen, 38, Pasadena, 2 November 1989
Albert Eloy Arce, 34, Deer Park, 7 November 1989 (listed as Eloy Albert Arce)
James Henry Campbell, Jr., 30, Baytown, 26 October 1989
Eloy Gonzales, 36, Houston, 1 November 1989
Mark Lloyd Greeson, 30, Pasadena, 28 October 1989
Delbert Lynn Haskell, 43, Deer Park, 29 October 1989
Scotty Dale Hawkins, 32, Houston, 28 October 1989
James Deowens Hubbard, 45, Houston, 25 October 1989 (listed as James Hubbard, Jr.)
Richard Leos, 30, La Porte, 29 October 1989
James Arthur Nichols, 40, Baytown, 27 October 1989
Jesse Thomas Northrup, 43, Brookshire, 28 October 1989
Mary Kathryn O'Connor, 34, Houston, 29 October 1989
Gerald Galen Pipher, 39, Deer Park, 30 October 1989
Cipriano Rodriguez, Jr., 42, Pasadena, 27 October 1989
Jesse Oscar Trevino, 33, Pearland, 30 October 1989
Lino Ralph Trujillo, 39, Pasadena, 29 October 1989
Nathan Gene Warner, 30, Deer Park, 24 October 1989

Fish Engineering employees
Fatally wounded and official dates of death 
Juan Manuel Garcia, 30 October 1989
Jose Lara Gonzalez, 23 October 1989
William Scott Martin, 25 October 1989
John Medrano, 30 October 1989 (listed as Juan Trejo-Medrano)

A granite memorial at  near 924 Jefferson Road, Pasadena, Texas was dedicated on the first anniversary of the disaster, and was declared by company officials to be open to the general public at all times.

OSHA findings
OSHA's major findings included: 
Lack of process hazard analysis
Inadequate standard operating procedures (SOPs)
Non-fail-safe block valve
Inadequate maintenance permitting system
Inadequate lockout/tagout procedures
Lack of combustible gas detection and alarm system
Presence of ignition sources
Inadequate ventilation systems for nearby buildings
Fire protection system not maintained in an adequate state of readiness.

Additional factors found by OSHA included: 
Proximity of high-occupancy structures (control rooms) to hazardous operations
Inadequate separation between buildings
Crowded process equipment
Insufficient separation between the reactors and the control room for emergency shutdown procedures.

Quoting from a key OSHA document:
"At the conclusion of the investigation (April 19, 1990), OSHA issued 566 willful and 9 serious violations with a combined total proposed penalty of $5,666,200 to Phillips Petroleum Company and 181 willful and 12 serious violations with a combined total proposed penalty of $729,600 to Fish Engineering and Construction, Inc., a maintenance contractor on the site."

OSHA citations
As a result of a settlement between OSHA and Phillips Petroleum Company, OSHA agreed to delete the willful characterization of the citations and Phillips Petroleum Company agreed to pay a $4 million fine and to institute process safety management procedures at HCC and the company's sister facilities at Sweeny, Texas; Borger, Texas; and Woods Cross, Utah.

Facility today

Today, the facility continues to manufacture polyethylene. This complex employs 450 workers for the production of speciality chemicals, including 150 operations and maintenance personnel.

The facility experienced additional fatalities in 1999 and 2000.

See also

1990 ARCO explosion
Chevron Phillips
List of industrial disasters

References

Explosions in 1989
1989 in Texas
Industrial fires and explosions in the United States
Chemical plant explosions
Disasters in Texas
Explosions in the United States
Fires in Texas
Pasadena, Texas
Phillips 66
Urban fires in the United States
October 1989 events in the United States
1989 disasters in the United States